The Garni Gorge is situated 23 km east of Yerevan, Armenia, just below the village of the same name. On a promontory above the gorge the first-century AD Temple of Garni may be seen. Along the sides of the gorge are cliff walls of well-preserved basalt columns, carved out by the Goght River. This portion of the Garni Gorge is typically referred to as the "Symphony of the Stones." It is most easily reached via a road that leads left down the gorge just before reaching the temple of Garni. Another road leads to the gorge through the village, down a cobblestone road, and into the valley. Once in the valley, turning right will lead to Garni Gorge, an 11th-century medieval bridge, and the "Symphony of the Stones". Taking a left will lead along the river past a fish hatchery, up to the Khosrov Forest State Reserve, and a little further Havuts Tar Monastery.

Gallery

References

External links

Armenian Wiki Encyclopedia on Garni Gorge

Landforms of Armenia
Columnar basalts
Volcanoes of Armenia
Geography of Kotayk Province
Tourist attractions in Kotayk Province
Canyons and gorges of Europe